E-6837 is an orally active, 5-HT6 agonist developed in an attempt to create an anti-obesity medication. In cell lines expressing rat 5-HT6 receptors, it acted as a partial agonist (on presumed silent receptors), while it acted as a full agonist on human 5-HT6 receptors (which are constitutively active). Oral administration of E-6837 reduced food intake, but only transiently. In rats, twice daily administration of E-6837 over the course of 4 weeks resulted in a 15.7% reduction in body weight, compared to 11% reduction for sibutramine. This weight loss remained significant for E-6837 after a 43-day withdrawal period, whereas the weight difference was non-significant for sibutramine (i.e., sibutramine had a rebound effect while E-6837 did not), and this weight loss was found to be due to a loss of fat mass. The reduction in fat mass in E-6837 treated animals was associated with a 50% decrease in plasma leptin levels, and also reduced glucose and insulin levels in plasma after a glucose tolerance test. This indicates that weight loss from E-6837 is associated with improved insulin sensitivity, and thus, better glycemic control.

One proposed mechanism of action is that E-6837 acts on neurons in the hypothalamus, which has shown significant levels of 5-HT6 receptor mRNA. The hypothalamus is one key structure involved in regulating food intake.

See also
 E-6801

References

5-HT6 agonists
Anorectics
Naphthalenes
Chloroarenes
Tryptamines